Charkhab (also Romanized as Charkhāb) is a village in Gamasiyab Rural District, in the Central District of Sahneh County, Kermanshah Province, Iran. At the 2006 census, its population was 144, in 32 families.

References 

Populated places in Sahneh County